Yelena Chernetsova (born 21 January 1971) is a Kazakhstani cross-country skier. She competed in five events at the 1994 Winter Olympics. She was the first woman to represent Kazakhstan at the Olympics.

Cross-country skiing results

Olympic Games

World Championships

World Cup

Season standings

References

1971 births
Living people
Kazakhstani female cross-country skiers
Olympic cross-country skiers of Kazakhstan
Cross-country skiers at the 1994 Winter Olympics
Place of birth missing (living people)
Asian Games medalists in cross-country skiing
Cross-country skiers at the 1996 Asian Winter Games
Asian Games silver medalists for Kazakhstan
Asian Games bronze medalists for Kazakhstan
Medalists at the 1996 Asian Winter Games
20th-century Kazakhstani women